The mountain owlet-nightjar (Aegotheles albertisi) is a species of bird in the family Aegothelidae. It is found in the highlands of New Guinea. Its natural habitat is subtropical or tropical moist montane forests.

References

mountain owlet-nightjar
Birds of New Guinea
mountain owlet-nightjar
mountain owlet-nightjar
Taxonomy articles created by Polbot